Iddaru Pellalu is a 1954 Indian Telugu-language drama film, produced and directed by F. Nagur. It stars N. T. Rama Rao and Jamuna, with music composed by T. R. Papa, T. K. Kumara Swamy & T. A. Kalyan Raman.

Plot
The film begins with Zamindar living with his wife Radha, the couple is perturbed as they are childless. Once Zamindar is acquainted with a dancer Pushpa at Madras in an accident who ensnares him with the help of her acolyte Appala Swamy. Right now, Zamindar convinces Radha and marries Pushpa. Thereafter, Pushpa corrals Zamindar to take over the authority. Time passes, and Radha becomes pregnant when vicious Pushpa throws the newborn baby into the dustbin and claims it is a miscarriage. Here Ramudu a sweeper rears the boy by the name of Mallaiah. As Ramudu's wife Lachi works at Zamindar's house, Mallaiah daily accompanies his mother where Radha develops unknown affection for him. Once Pushpa beats Mallaiah badly when Ramudu retorts, so, Zamindar fires them. Thereafter, Radha visits Ramudu's home for Mallaiah when Pushpa ruse against her and makes Zamindar suspect her chastity. In enrage, he batters her, assumes she is dead and loses consciousness.

At Present, Pushpa & Appala Swamy try to dispose of her when she silently escapes. Eventually, Ramudu & Lachi also leave the village. Time passes, and Mallaiah becomes a sculptor and falls for a beautiful girl Kannamma. Once he saves Radha from an accident and Kannamma gives her shelter when Ramudu & Lachi also recognizes her. On the other side, Pushpa, who is enjoying Zamindar's wealth seizes him in a room, where he repents and senses how treacherous having two wives is. Meanwhile, Radha learns about the plight, so she tries to secretly visit the Zamindar, but Pushpa necks her out. At that point, Zamindar overhears the conversation between Pushpa & Appala Swamy and understands the entire truth. Simultaneously, Ramudu & Lachi arrive and realize Mallaiah is Zamindar's son. Immediately, they all rush up for Radha and get her back. At last, Pushpa dies consuming poison. Finally, the movie ends on a happy note with the marriage of Mallaiah & Kannamma.

Cast
N. T. Rama Rao as Mallaiah
Jamuna as Kannamma
C.S.R as the Zamindar
Kasturi Siva Rao as Appala Swamy
K. V. Ramana Rao as Ramudu
K. Ram Murthy as Shavkaru
M. V. Rajamma as Radha
Lakshmikantham as Pushpa Rani
Gangaratnam as Lachi
Kanakam as Appala Swamy's wife
Dhanam as Miss Prema

Soundtrack

Music composed by T. R. Papa, T. K. Kumara Swamy & T. A. Kalyan Raman. Lyrics were written by Kopalli Venkataramana Rao.

References

External links 

 

Indian drama films
Films scored by T. R. Pappa
1954 drama films
1954 films